Bäriswil is the name of two places in Switzerland:

 Bäriswil, Bern, in the Canton of Bern
 Bäriswil, Solothurn, in the Canton of Solothurn